Wassén is a surname. Notable people with the surname include:

Folke Wassén (1918–1969), Swedish sailor 
Henry Wassén (1908–1996), Swedish social anthropologist and museum head
Magnus Wassén (1920–2014), Swedish sailor

See also
Wassen (surname)